Joe "Guitar" Hughes (born Maurice Hughes; September 29, 1937 – May 20, 2003) was an American blues musician from Houston, Texas.

Career
Hughes was inspired by Clarence "Gatemouth" Brown and Johnny "Guitar" Watson – "anyone who had fire in their playing and a good shuffle". His first band was the Dukes of Rhythm in the 1950s, which also included his friend Johnny Copeland. He worked with Little Richard and in Bobby Bland's band in the 1960s.

He toured in Europe starting in the 1980s and released Texas Guitar Master on the Dutch label Double Trouble Records in 1986. The album included a live track with Hughes and fellow guitarist Pete Mayes. If You Want to See the Blues was released by Black Top Records in 1989.

Hughes died of a heart attack on May 20, 2003.

Selected discography
1986 - Texas Guitar Master (Double Trouble), featuring Pete Mayes
1988 - Craftsman (Double Trouble)
1989 - If You Want to See the Blues (Black Top)
1995 - Down & Depressed (The Network)
1996 - Live at Vrendenburg (Double Trouble)
1996 - Texas Guitar Slinger (Bullseye Blues)
2001 - Stuff Like That (Blues Express)

See also
List of electric blues musicians
List of Texas blues musicians

References

External links
Times Online obituary

1937 births
2003 deaths
American blues guitarists
American male guitarists
Electric blues musicians
Texas blues musicians
People from Houston
Black Top Records artists
20th-century American guitarists
Guitarists from Texas
20th-century American male musicians